Lord Montagu William Graham (2 February 1807 – 21 June 1878) was a British Conservative politician.

Background
Graham was a younger son of James Graham, 3rd Duke of Montrose, by his second wife Lady Caroline Maria, daughter of George Montagu, 4th Duke of Manchester. James Graham, 4th Duke of Montrose, was his elder brother.

Political career
Graham was Member of Parliament (MP) for Dunbartonshire from 1830 to 1832, for Grantham from 1852 to 1857, and for Herefordshire from 1858 to 1865.

Family
Graham married the Hon. Harriet Anne, daughter of William Bateman-Hanbury, 1st Baron Bateman, and widow of George Dashwood, in 1867. He died in June 1878, aged 71. His wife survived him by six years and died in April 1884.

References

External links 
 

1807 births
1878 deaths
Younger sons of dukes
Scottish Tory MPs (pre-1912)
Members of the Parliament of the United Kingdom for Scottish constituencies
Conservative Party (UK) MPs for English constituencies
UK MPs 1830–1831
UK MPs 1831–1832
UK MPs 1852–1857
UK MPs 1857–1859
UK MPs 1859–1865